Meteor Man is a comic book sequel of the 1993 MGM film The Meteor Man. Marvel Comics produced a six-issue limited series which ran from July 1993 to January 1994. It was written by Bert B Hubbard and Dwight D Coye, and illustrated by Robert Walker and Jon Holdredge, where Meteor Man met Spider-Man and Night Thrasher. The fictional superhero was created by director/actor/writer, Robert Townsend.

This comic should not be confused with the Spider-Man villain Looter who later went by the name.

Fictional character biography
The Meteor Man is a formerly cowardly schoolteacher named Jefferson Reed living in Washington D.C. where his neighborhood was terrorized by a gang called the Golden Lords who are allied with a drug lord named Anthony Byers. One day, he witnessed a robbery by two kids who were trying to join the Golden Lords. After hiding in a dumpster to evade the pursuing members, he emerges and is struck by a chunk of green meteor that grants him superpowers. He eventually uses his new-found powers (with the help of the fed-up residents) to clean up the neighborhood and put the Golden Lords out of business.

However, the Golden Lords' leader Simon Cain has also been exposed to the same meteor. Both men try to avoid getting drained of their powers and need constant exposure to a meteor fragment or they will lose their powers. Jefferson absorbed the energies in Simon and defeated them. When Simon was defeated, Anthony and his men show up to finish the job as the Bloods and the Crips come to Meteor Man's side. Anthony and his men plan to "take a vacation in the Bahamas." Just then, the police arrive and arrest the bad guys.

In an effort to gain a constant supply, Simon Cain has volunteered himself for study to a secret government facility, and one storyline had Jefferson Reed going to Arizona as it is rumored that a larger hunk of the same meteor had landed near the Grand Canyon.

Powers and abilities
The meteor that struck Jefferson Reed gave him superpowers that ranged from superhuman strength, speed and hearing, healing powers, flight, x-ray/laser vision, invulnerability, telekinesis, super breath, weather manipulation and the ability to communicate with dogs and imbue fertility.

When Meteor Man touches a book, he can temporarily absorb the contents of the book and use it for 30 seconds.

Weaknesses
The one weakness to Meteor Man is that his powers are easily drained that he must recharge by touching a meteor fragment.

See also
 Looter, a Marvel Comics supervillain who gains his powers from meteor gas.

External links
 Meteor Man at Marvel Wiki
 Meteor Man at Comic Vine
 Meteor Man at International Hero

Marvel Comics titles
African-American superheroes
Comics based on films
Superhero comics
1993 comics debuts